Highpoint (also 80 Newington Butts, and previously referred to as 360 London) is a 142-metre, 46-storey, 458-apartment residential tower  in Elephant and Castle in the London Borough of Southwark in London on the site of the London Park Hotel.

It was the tallest build-to-rent development in the country at the time of construction, and one of London's tallest residential buildings.

On completion in 2018, 343 one- and two-bedroom apartments were made available for rent to private tenants. The building features a 24/7 gym, and a "sky lounge" on the 45th floor, with a bar, kitchen and co-working space, accessible by residents only.

The building is managed by Canadian real estate manager Realstar Living under its UK brand UNCLE. It is one of 5 properties managed by the company in London. They have another one in Manchester.

Under previous plans the privately rented apartments were to be managed by Essential Living. The other 115 units are rented as affordable housing units by the Peabody Trust.

A 300-seat flexible theatre space located in the building has been leased to the Southwark Playhouse to become its flagship venue and the location of a purpose-built Youth, Community and Development space. The move is scheduled to take place in 2021.

The site also features a commercial unit, currently operating as a branch of a healthy-living cafe bar chain of two establishments, called Nue Ground.

Articles
 Green light for Elephant & Castle tower and theatre, London SE1, 5 Sep 2007
 Elephant & Castle 360 tower project to be revived, London SE1, 3 March 2011
 Mayor announces ‘affordable flats’ tower at Elephant and Castle, London SE1 31, July 2013
 Government could pour more cash into Elephant & Castle skyscraper, London SE1, 11 March 2014

See also
 List of tallest buildings in the United Kingdom
 Build-to-rent

References

Redevelopment projects in London
Residential skyscrapers in London
Skyscrapers in the London Borough of Southwark
Apartment buildings in London